"Today All Over Again" is a song written by Bobby Harden and Lola Jean Dillon, and recorded by American country music artist Reba McEntire.  It was released in July 1981 as the first single from the album Heart to Heart.  The song reached #5 on the Billboard Hot Country Singles & Tracks chart. It became her first single to ever reach the top five. Ricky Skaggs and Susie McEntire provided backing vocals.

Chart performance

References

1981 singles
1981 songs
Reba McEntire songs
Song recordings produced by Jerry Kennedy
Mercury Records singles
Songs written by Lola Jean Dillon
Songs written by Bobby Harden